German submarine U-657 was a Type VIIC U-boat built for Nazi Germany's Kriegsmarine for service during World War II.
She was laid down on 5 October 1940 by Howaldtswerke, Hamburg as yard number 806, launched on 12 August 1941 and commissioned on 8 October 1941 under Oberleutnant zur See Hans-Jürgen Radke.

Radke was killed in a fire while the boat was undergoing trials on 14 December 1941.

Design
German Type VIIC submarines were preceded by the shorter Type VIIB submarines. U-657 had a displacement of  when at the surface and  while submerged. She had two shafts and two  propellers.

U-657 was fitted with five  torpedo tubes (four fitted at the bow and one at the stern), fourteen torpedoes, one  SK C/35 naval gun, 220 rounds, and a  C/30 anti-aircraft gun. The boat had a complement of between forty-four and sixty.

Service history
The boat's career began with training at 8th U-boat Flotilla on 8 October 1941, followed by active service on 1 March 1942 as part of the 3rd Flotilla in La Pallice, France. Four months later, she transferred to 11th Flotilla, in Bergen, Norway, for the remainder of her service.

Wolfpacks
U-657 took part in six wolfpacks, namely:
 Naseweis (31 March – 10 April 1942)
 Eisteufel (21 June – 8 July 1942)
 Nebelkönig (27 July – 14 August 1942)
 Nordwind (24 January – 4 February 1943)
 Iller (12 – 15 May 1943)
 Donau 1 (15 – 17 May 1943)

Fate
U-657 was sunk on 17 May 1943 in the North Atlantic, E of Cape Farewell, Greenland, in position , by depth charges from Royal Navy frigate . All hands were lost.

Summary of raiding history

References

Bibliography

External links

German Type VIIC submarines
1941 ships
U-boats commissioned in 1941
Ships lost with all hands
U-boats sunk in 1943
U-boats sunk by depth charges
U-boats sunk by British warships
World War II shipwrecks in the Atlantic Ocean
World War II submarines of Germany
Ships built in Hamburg
Maritime incidents in May 1943